Peter Kendal Hargreaves CBE (born 5 October 1946) is an English co-founder with Stephen Lansdown of Hargreaves Lansdown, one of the United Kingdom's largest financial services businesses. He is a shareholder of Hargreaves Lansdown but no longer a director or employee. He is a partner in Blue Whale Capital, an investment boutique that was launched in 2017.

Early life
Hargreaves was born in Clitheroe and educated at Clitheroe Royal Grammar School in Lancashire.

Career
Trained as an accountant, Peter Hargreaves initially worked as a computer salesman. He then started Hargreaves Lansdown trading from a bedroom in 1981; in 2010, he stood down as chief executive and, in the same year, received £18 million in payouts from dividends. He was succeeded as CEO by Ian Gorham. His wealth was reported at £2,315 million according to the Sunday Times Rich List 2017, making him the 51st richest person in the UK.  Hargreaves joined the board of ITM Power in February 2004 as a non-executive director: he has invested heavily in ITM Power. In March 2016 he joined the Leave.EU movement to campaign for the UK's exit from the European Union. He was the top donor to the Brexit campaign contributing over £3 million to the Leave campaign. In September 2017, Hargreaves announced a £25 million backing in Blue Whale Capital – a new asset management company set up by previous colleague, Stephen Yiu.

It was announced in August 2020 that Hargreaves would receive £63.4 million in dividends after Hargreaves Lansdown's profits increased by 24% to £378.3 million in the 12 months leading up to 30 June 2020.

According to The Sunday Times Rich List in 2020 his net worth was estimated at £2.4 billion. In 2021, he came ninth in a list of the top ten biggest taxpayers in the UK, having paid a tax bill of £91.4 million that year.

Honours
Hargreaves was appointed Commander of the Order of the British Empire (CBE) in the 2014 New Year Honours for services to business innovation, financial services, and the City of Bristol.

Politics
Hargreaves financially supported the Leave.EU campaign in 2016, donating £3.2m to the Leave.EU campaign founded by Arron Banks and wrote to 15 million UK householders asking them to support the leave campaign in the European Union membership referendum.

In May 2016, Hargreaves said that Brexit will lead to insecurity, which will turn out to be very effective. Hargreaves said that Theresa May should reassure the three million EU nationals already in the UK that their current rights would be maintained.

Hargreaves donated £1m to the Conservatives’ election fund in 2019.

Personal life
In 1986 he married Rosemary; they have one son and one daughter. They live in a Georgian property in the West Country, where he grows his own vegetables. He owns three racehorses.

References

External links
 Peter Hargreaves biography page on the Hargreaves Lansdown website.
 Peter Hargreaves biography page on the Blue Whale Capital website.

English businesspeople
1946 births
Living people
Commanders of the Order of the British Empire
People educated at Clitheroe Royal Grammar School
People from Clitheroe
British Eurosceptics
Conservative Party (UK) donors